Resan (Swedish: Journey) is a 1987 documentary film by Peter Watkins. Resan may also refer to
Resan bort, a 1945 Swedish drama film 
Resan till dej (The Journey to You), a 1953 Swedish comedy film
Den ständiga resan, 1992 studio album by Swedish singer-songwriter Marie Fredriksson
"Resan till dig", a 2011 single by Belarusian-Norwegian artist Alexander Rybak

See also
Rasan (disambiguation) or Resan, an Arabic name